Mircea Fechet (born 1 July 1980) is a Romanian politician. He served as Minister for Environment, Waters and Forests from 5 November 2020 to 23 December 2020. Barna Tánczos was appointed as his successor.

He was elected to the Chamber of Deputies in December 2020.

References 

Living people
1980 births
Place of birth missing (living people)
Romanian Ministers of the Environment
Members of the Chamber of Deputies (Romania)